Sessea brasiliensis is a species of plant in the family Solanaceae. It is endemic to Brazil.

References

Cestroideae
Flora of Brazil
Data deficient plants
Taxonomy articles created by Polbot
Plants described in 1941